Inst may refer to:

 As "inst.", abbreviation for instant, with reference to time
 Alternative shortened Instagram name
 As "inst.", abbreviation for instante mense, meaning a date of the current month, such as "the 5th inst."
 The Royal Belfast Academical Institution, a grammar school in Belfast, Northern Ireland
 Tuskegee University, Alabama, United States
 Bannari Amman Institute of Technology, Tamil Nadu, India
 Instrumental, with reference to music